Prodigal Son is a novel by the best-selling author Dean Koontz, released in 2005. The book is the first book released by Koontz in a series of five, entitled Dean Koontz's Frankenstein. The book was co-authored by Kevin J. Anderson.

Plot
The basic plot follows New Orleans detective Carson and her partner Michael on the hunt for a serial killer dubbed "The Surgeon". Reports of this killer catch the attention of Deucalion, formerly known as The Monster, who believes his former master and maker, Dr. Victor Frankenstein, has returned. As the body count grows, the case takes a darker turn when Carson encounters Deucalion, pushing Carson and Michael on to the path of a 200-year-old mystery and evil that threatens more than just New Orleans.

Development
The concept for the series was adapted from a treatment written by Koontz and Anderson for the 2004 TV movie Frankenstein, which was produced for the USA Network.  Koontz withdrew from the project over creative differences with the network, and the production continued in a different direction with similar characters and a modified plot while Koontz was allowed to publish his own series.

TV series
In October 2012, the production company 1019 Entertainment announced they had purchased the rights to the entire Koontz Frankenstein book series.  Plans were announced to develop it as a television series for TNT with writer James V. Hart and his son Jake Hart scripting the project.

References

External links
Dean Koontz's Frankenstein at Dean Koontz's website

American horror novels
2005 American novels
Novels by Dean Koontz
Novels by Kevin J. Anderson
American biopunk novels
Collaborative novels
Novels set in New Orleans
Frankenstein novels